Chris Sander is a computational biologist based at the Dana-Farber Cancer Center and Harvard Medical School. Previously he was chair of the Computational Biology Programme at the Memorial Sloan–Kettering Cancer Center in New York City. In 2015, he moved his lab to the Dana–Farber Cancer Institute and the Cell Biology Department at Harvard Medical School.

Education
Sander originally trained as a physicist receiving his undergraduate degree from the University of Berlin in 1967. After a period studying at the University of California, Berkeley and the Niels Bohr Institute in Copenhagen, he gained his PhD degree in theoretical physics from the State University of New York in 1975. His thesis was titled Analytic properties of bound state wave functions.

Research
Sander credits his move from theoretical physics to computational biology to Fred Sanger's 1977 landmark paper in Nature, in which the nucleotide sequence of bacteriophage φX174 was published. Sander has made many contributions to the field of structural bioinformatics including developing tools such as the Families of Structurally Similar Proteins (FSSP) database and the DSSP algorithm for assigning secondary structure to the amino acids of a protein, given the atomic-resolution coordinates of that protein.

Sander has also worked at the European Bioinformatics Institute, has served as chief information officer for the biopharmaceutical company Millennium Pharmaceuticals and has been an advisor to IBM's Deep Computing Initiative, which produced the Deep Blue chess computer.

Awards and honours
Sander is a former Executive Editor for the journal Bioinformatics. In 2014 he was appointed one of the first Honorary Editors of Bioinformatics.

Sander was awarded the ISCB Accomplishment by a Senior Scientist Award in 2010. He was awarded the 2018 DeLano Award for Computational Biosciences.

Personal life
Sander is the brother of German actor Otto Sander.

References

American bioinformaticians
Living people
Fellows of the International Society for Computational Biology
Computational chemists
Year of birth missing (living people)
Humboldt University of Berlin alumni